Kankavali railway station is a major train station located in the city of Kankavli on Konkan Railways. It is at a distance of  down from origin. The preceding station on the line is Nandgaon Road railway station and the next station is Sindhudurg railway station.

The station offers free Wi-Fi.

References

Railway stations along Konkan Railway line
Railway stations in Sindhudurg district
Ratnagiri railway division